María Guadalupe Sánchez Morales (born 20 February 1996) is a professional footballer who plays as a forward for the Houston Dash. Born in the United States, she represents the Mexico women's national team.

Sánchez played American collegiate soccer at Idaho State University before leaving in April 2016. She subsequently concluded her collegiate career at Santa Clara University in 2018.

Sánchez began her professional career with American club Chicago Red Stars, who selected Sánchez with the fifteenth overall pick in the 2019 NWSL College Draft. After the 2019 NWSL season, Sánchez signed with Guadalajara of the Liga MX Femenil for 2020. In 2021, she moved to Tigres UANL and won the 2021 Clausura title. In the summer 2021, Sánchez had a month-long loan to American club Houston Dash, who later signed her permanently.

A senior and former youth Mexican international, Sánchez played at the 2015 FIFA Women's World Cup and the 2016 FIFA U-20 Women's World Cup.

Early life and high school
Sánchez is the daughter of Mexican-born Roberto Sánchez and Irene Morales, who as of 2015 were employed at a potato processing plant in American Falls, Idaho, United States. No club team was locally available, nor could her parents afford the costs of enrolling her on an elite club team, so Sánchez played only high school soccer. Sánchez was a four-year letter-winner at American Falls High School. She was the scoring leader in the state of Idaho in all four years, scoring 26, 34, 50, and 78 goals in her freshman, sophomore, junior, and senior years, respectively. Her number was later retired by American Falls High School.

College career

Idaho State University
Despite her high school record, Idaho State Bengals was the only collegiate program that offered Sánchez a scholarship because she did not play elite club soccer. Sánchez played for Idaho State in 2014 and 2015. As a freshman in 2014, Sánchez scored seven goals and led the team and conference with 8 assists. She was named to the Big Sky Conference All-Academic team. In her sophomore year, for a team that had a record of one win, one tie, and 15 losses, Sánchez scored 15 goals and had 4 assists in 17 games. She was named to the All-Conference team.

Controversy
In April 2016, Sánchez announced she was leaving Idaho State University to seek a more "competitive environment." Idaho State denied her permission to contact other universities and alleged that a third party was assisting her contrary to NCAA rules. About 50 university teams had expressed interest in her, but Idaho State denied her request to communicate with five universities, all major women's soccer powers. Idaho State further alleged that those five schools had communicated with Sánchez without permission. Sánchez denied the allegations and responded that Idaho State was blocking her soccer career. Idaho State subsequently granted her request to contact Santa Clara University and South Florida University.

Santa Clara University
Sánchez enrolled at Santa Clara in January 2017 and began playing for the Santa Clara Broncos. She appeared in all 23 games in 2017, scored five goals, and tied for the West Coast Conference lead with six assists. In 2018, Sánchez appeared in 19 games and scored eight goals. She had 16 assists, first among players in all NCAA Division I programs.

Club career

Chicago Red Stars
On January 11, 2019, Sánchez was drafted by the Chicago Red Stars of the National Women's Soccer League (NWSL). She made seven appearances with the club in 2019.

Guadalajara
On 13 December 2019, Sánchez was announced by Liga MX Femenil club CD Guadalajara as their next signing on loan for the Clausura 2020. She wore number 7 for Chivas. At the end of the Apertura 2020, it was announced that Sánchez was one of several players who would leave the club.

Tigres UANL
Sánchez signed with Tigres UANL for 2021 and helped the team win the Clausura 2021. After a loan to the Houston Dash for June, Sánchez returned for the Apertura 2020 in which UANL reached the final and lost in a shootout. The club posted a farewell video on December 22, and Sánchez replied with gratitude for her to fulfill her "dreams."

Houston Dash

2021 (loan)
In March 2021, Houston Dash acquired Sánchez's NWSL rights from Chicago in exchange for Houston's second-round pick in the 2022 NWSL Draft. She signed for a month-long loan from Tigres in June 2021 and scored her first goal in the league in a 2-1 victory over the Orlando Pride. Although her loan ended, Houston retained her NWSL rights.

2022 season
Prior to the 2022 NWSL Expansion Draft, the Dash released a list of nine protected players that included "a contracted international player who has not yet been announced." The NWSL released the same list but named Sánchez as that player, although her contract signing would not be officially announced until 2022. On 6 January 2022, the Dash announced that Sánchez had been signed to a two-year contact. “Joining the Dash is such a privilege for me,” Sánchez said. “It’s getting another shot at my dream, and I couldn’t be more excited to do it with a team and coaching staff that I have tremendous respect for!”

International career
Sánchez was eligible to represent Mexico and the United States at the international level.

In 2015, Sánchez's coach at Idaho State told her about a tryout for the Mexico women's national under-20 football team. She made the team and, after good performances, was named to join the senior Mexico women's national football team for the 2015 FIFA Women's World Cup. She was the second youngest player on the World Cup team. Sánchez played as a midfielder in one match, a loss to England, in the World Cup.

International goals

References

External links
 
 
 
 Profile at Mexican Football Federation 
 

1996 births
Living people
Citizens of Mexico through descent
Mexican women's footballers
Women's association football midfielders
Tigres UANL (women) footballers
Liga MX Femenil players
Mexico women's international footballers
2015 FIFA Women's World Cup players
Pan American Games competitors for Mexico
Footballers at the 2019 Pan American Games
People from Nampa, Idaho
People from American Falls, Idaho
Soccer players from Idaho
American women's soccer players
Idaho State Bengals women's soccer players
Santa Clara Broncos women's soccer players
Chicago Red Stars draft picks
Chicago Red Stars players
Houston Dash players
National Women's Soccer League players
American sportspeople of Mexican descent
Pan American Games bronze medalists for Mexico
Medalists at the 2015 Pan American Games
Footballers at the 2015 Pan American Games
Pan American Games medalists in football